Jay Idzes (born 2 June 2000) is a Dutch professional footballer who plays as a defender for Dutch football club Go Ahead Eagles.

Club career
Born in Mierlo, Idzes made his Eerste Divisie debut for FC Eindhoven on 28 April 2018 in a game against TOP Oss, as an 89th-minute substitute for Hervé Matthys.

On 20 July 2020, Idzes moved to Go Ahead Eagles after a drawn out transfer saga, where his new club initially thought that his contract with Eindhoven had expired, but eventually agreed to pay an undisclosed fee.

Personal life
Born in the Netherlands, Idze is of Indonesian descent.

References

External links
 

2000 births
Living people
Dutch footballers
Dutch people of Indonesian descent
Association football midfielders
FC Eindhoven players
Go Ahead Eagles players
Eerste Divisie players
Eredivisie players
People from Mierlo
Footballers from North Brabant
21st-century Dutch people